Marco Fábio Maldonado Pigossi (born 1 February 1989) is a Brazilian actor and producer. He is known for playing Dylan on the Australian television series Tidelands, and for playing Eric in the Brazilian series Invisible City.

Career
Pigossi started in the theater at the age of 13, when he decided to take a class out of curiosity and was charmed, at 17 he graduated. He became a professional swimmer, being runner-up of the state of São Paulo in 2005, by the club Athlético Paulistano. In 2003, he was selected by SBT to act in the Brazilian version of Rebelde Way as Paulo Roberto, he would be part of the band and had already recorded songs and three chapters. However, the version was frowned upon by Cris Morena Group.

In 2004, he transferred to Rede Globo, and was part of the cast of the miniseries Um Só Coração, where he played the revolutionary student Dráusio Marcondes de Souza. In 2007, he participated in Eterna Magia, playing Miguel Finnegan, shortly after, still in 2007, he made the teen Bruno in the miniseries Queridos Amigos.

In 2009, he made his most successful character, in the telenovela Caras & Bocas, playing the homosexual character Cássio. In 2010, he made a playboy in the remake Ti Ti Ti, where he played Pedro Luís, eldest son of the protagonist Jacques Léclair (Alexandre Borges). In 2011, he was part of the cast of Fina Estampa in the role of Rafael.

In 2012, he joined the cast of the telenovela Gabriela playing Juvenal Leal. In 2013 he played Bento, the protagonist of Sangue Bom, making a romantic couple with Amora Campana (Sophie Charlotte) and Malu Campana (Fernanda Vasconcellos).

In 2014, Pigossi was quoted to play a role in Now Generation, however due to changes in the cast, he was replaced by Fiuk, and moved to the remake O Rebu; but had to leave the cast of this telenovela, to replace Caio Castro, in the role of Raphael, protagonist of Boogie Oogie. Still in 2014, he was cast to A Regra do Jogo, portraying the police officer Dante.

In 2017, he played the passionate trucker José Ribamar do Carmo (Zeca), in A Força do Querer, one of the eight protagonists of the novel, making romantic pair with the seductive Ritinha (Isis Valverde) and the police woman Jeiza (Paolla Oliveira).

In 2018, he decided not to renew with Rede Globo, and amends two series of Netflix: Tidelands, supernatural police drama and the first Australian original series and Invisible City that will portray an underworld inhabited by mythical creatures that evolved from a lineage of Brazilian folklore.

Personal life
Pigossi was born in São Paulo, the son of Mariness Maldonado and Oswaldo Pigossi. He graduated in social communication with a degree in Radio and TV from Anhembi Morumbi University.
In November 2021, Pigossi made public his relationship with Italian director Marco Calvani.

Since 2018, Pigossi lives in Los Angeles.

Filmography

Television

Film

Theater

Awards and nominations

References

External links

1989 births
Living people
Brazilian LGBT actors
Male actors from São Paulo
Brazilian people of Italian descent
Brazilian male television actors
Brazilian male film actors
Brazilian male stage actors
Brazilian Muay Thai practitioners
21st-century Brazilian male actors
Brazilian emigrants to Australia